Red Branch (1989), by the Irish-American author Morgan Llywelyn, is a novel about the life of the Irish hero Cú Chulainn.  Red Branch novelizes several stories from the Ulster Cycle of Irish mythology, including the well-known Táin Bó Cúailnge (Cattle Raid of Cooley) and Deirdre (of the Sorrows).

1989 fantasy novels
Novels by Morgan Llywelyn
Works based on the Ulster Cycle
Novels set in Ireland
William Morrow and Company books